Tarkan Serbest (born 2 May 1994) is a Turkish professional footballer who plays as a midfielder for Süper Lig club Kasımpaşa.

International career
Serbest was born in Austria and is of Turkish descent. A former youth international for Austria, he switched to represent the Turkey national football team and made his debut in a 2-1 friendly win over Iran on 28 May 2018.

References

External links
 OEFB Profile
 OEFB National Profile

Living people
1994 births
Footballers from Vienna
Turkish footballers
Turkey international footballers
Austrian footballers
Austria youth international footballers
Austrian people of Turkish descent
Austrian Football Bundesliga players
Süper Lig players
FK Austria Wien players
Kasımpaşa S.K. footballers
Association football midfielders